The Billboard Music Award for Top Gospel Artist winners and nominees.

Winners and nominees

References

Billboard awards